Castriota is a surname. Notable people with the surname include:

 Costantino Castriota (1477–1500), Albanian nobleman
 Jason Castriota, American automobile designer
 Samuel Castriota (1885–1932), Argentinian pianist, guitarist and composer

See also
 Candidula castriota, species of snail
 House of Kastrioti, noble family
 Kastriot (disambiguation)